330 North Wabash (formerly IBM Plaza also known as IBM Building and now renamed AMA Plaza) is a skyscraper in downtown Chicago, Illinois, United States, at 330 N. Wabash Avenue, designed by the architect Ludwig Mies van der Rohe (who died in 1969 before construction began). A small bust of the architect by sculptor Marino Marini is displayed in the lobby. The 52-story building is situated on a plaza overlooking the Chicago River. At , 330 North Wabash is the second-tallest building by Mies van der Rohe, the tallest being the Toronto-Dominion Bank Tower at Toronto-Dominion Centre. It was his last American building.

The building's original corporate namesake no longer owns nor has offices in the building. IBM sold IBM Plaza to the Blackstone Group in 1996. IBM all but completed its move out of IBM Plaza as of early 2006, taking up space in the new Hyatt Center building closer to Union Station. Current major tenants are the American Medical Association, Langham Chicago managed by Langham Hotels International, WeWork and law firm Latham & Watkins.

The former IBM Plaza has several design features that are rare in an office building but understandable given its original owner. The building's electrical system, environmental system, floor strength, and ceiling height (on certain floors) can support large raised floor computing centers. With even more need to contain possible electrical fires, fire safety was especially important, and asbestos was one of the most useful fire prevention materials of that era. As with most other buildings of that era, asbestos abatement is an ongoing aspect of building life, with air quality monitoring, asbestos "mapping," and opportunistic asbestos removal when feasible. Also, given IBM's traditional office hours, large number of workers, and commercial interest in marketing then emerging electronic building control systems (notably the IBM Series/1 and its predecessors), the "banked" intelligent passenger elevator system (with separate all-floor cargo elevators) is significantly over-provisioned for a building of its size and rarely keeps anyone waiting long for service. IBM Plaza stayed dry during the 1992 Chicago Flood.

In 2007, plans were announced to convert floors two through thirteen of the 52-story building into a high-end hotel. The Langham, Chicago which opened in 2013, occupying floors two through thirteen. The Langham Hotel in the building was named the best hotel in the United States by US News in 2017.  The building was declared a Chicago Landmark on February 6, 2008, and added to the National Register of Historic Places on March 26, 2010. It is the youngest building in Chicago on both lists.

On December 9, 2011, the American Medical Association announced it would move its headquarters and entire workforce to 330 N. Wabash from its previous headquarters on State Street. The move occurred in September 2013 and the building was renamed AMA Plaza.

Position in Chicago's skyline

Gallery

In popular culture
The building is seen briefly in the film The Corporation.
This building is used in The Dark Knight, where it is the location of Harvey Dent's and Mayor Anthony Garcia's offices as well as the Wayne Enterprises headquarters (including the company board room).
This building is used in Dhoom 3, where Sahir Khan's apartment was.
The building is also used in the opening episode (Season 1, Episode 1) of the original Netflix series Ozark, where Jason Bateman's character and his business partner are touring potential new office space.
 In Buck Rogers That Man on Beta (1979 novel), the building (set in year 2492) is collapsed and makes a bridge to the Inner City. This is due to the nuclear holocaust in 1987.

Current tenants
American Medical Association
Latham & Watkins
SmithBucklin
Swanson Martin & Bell
WeWork
BDO USA, LLP
Thornton Tomasetti

Former tenants
Chicagoland Chamber of Commerce
IBM
Mercury Records - moved to New York City when consolidated into PolyGram Records, now part of Universal Music Group
Jenner & Block

See also
List of buildings
List of skyscrapers
List of tallest buildings in Chicago
List of tallest buildings in the United States
World's tallest structures

References

External links

330 N Wabash building website
The LanghamChicago website
Emporis.com page

Office buildings completed in 1973
IBM facilities
Ludwig Mies van der Rohe buildings
Commercial buildings on the National Register of Historic Places in Chicago
Skyscraper office buildings in Chicago
1973 establishments in Illinois
Leadership in Energy and Environmental Design basic silver certified buildings
Skyscraper hotels in Chicago